Nucleonica is a nuclear science web portal created by the European Commission's Joint Research Centre. which was later spun off to the company Nucleonica GmbH in March 2011.

History
The company Nucleonica GmbH was founded by Dr. Joseph Magill in 2011 as a spin-off from the European Commission's Joint Research Centre, Institute for Transuranium Elements. In addition to providing user friendly access to nuclear data, the main focus of Nucleonica is to provide professionals in the nuclear industry with a suite of validated scientific applications for everyday calculations.

The portal is also suitable for education and training in the nuclear field, both for technicians and degree-level and programmes in Nuclear engineering technology.

Nucleonica GmbH also took responsibility for the management and development of the Karlsruhe Nuclide Chart print and online versions.

User access
Users can register for free access to Nucleonica. This free access gives the user access to most applications but is restricted to a limited number of nuclides. For full access to all nuclides and applications, the user can upgrade to Premium for which there is an annual user charge.

References

Notes

Sources

External links

Internet properties established in 2011
Nuclear physics
Science websites
Web portals